The 2018 Seattle Mariners season was the 42nd season in franchise history. The Mariners played their 19th full season (20th overall) at Safeco Field, their home ballpark. The Mariners entered this season with the longest active playoff drought in the four major North American professional sports, failing to make their first postseason appearance since 2001. At several points in the season, the Mariners were 10 games ahead of the Oakland Athletics in the AL Wild Card race, but ended up finishing eight games behind them. The Mariners were eliminated from playoff contention on September 22 with the Athletics win against the Minnesota Twins. The Mariners began the season on March 29, 2018 against the Cleveland Indians and finished the season on September 30 against the Texas Rangers.

The Mariners were led by manager Scott Servais in his third year as manager.

Offseason and spring training
On December 7, 2017, the Mariners traded three minor leaguers to the Miami Marlins for Dee Gordon and $1 million in international slot money. General manager Jerry Dipoto stated he planned to use Gordon in center field instead of his usual second base.

On March 6, 2018, the Mariners signed free agent Ichiro Suzuki for a $750k salary with incentives up to $2M. He returned to the Seattle Mariners after five years being with the New York Yankees and the Miami Marlins, respectively.

Regular season

Game log

|-style=background:#bfb
|1||March 29|| Indians || 2–1 || Hernández (1–0) || Kluber (0–1) || Díaz (1) || 47,149 || 1–0 || W1
|-style=background:#fbb
|2||March 31|| Indians || 5–6 || Carrasco (1–0) || Paxton (0–1) || Allen (1) || 35,881 || 1–1 || L1
|-

|-style=background:#bfb
|3||April 1|| Indians || 5–4 || Leake (1–0) || Otero (0–1) || Díaz (2) || 24,506 || 2–1 || W1
|-style=background:#bfb
|4||April 3||@ Giants || 6–4 || Gonzales (1–0) || Blach (1–1) || Díaz (3) || 40,901 || 3–1 || W2
|-style=background:#fbb
|5||April 4||@ Giants || 1–10 || Cueto (1–0) || Hernández (1–1) || — || 42,582 || 3–2 || L1
|-style=background:#fbb
|6||April 5||@ Twins || 2–4 || Duke (1–0) || Altavilla (0–1) || Rodney (1) || 39,214 || 3–3 || L2
|-style=background:#bfb
|7||April 7||@ Twins || 11–4 || Leake (2–0) || Berríos (1–1) || — || 18,416 || 4–3 || W1
|-style=background:#bbb
| – ||April 8||@ Twins || Colspan=7| Postponed (inclement weather); Rescheduled for May 14th.
|-style=background:#fbb
|8||April 9||@ Royals || 0–10 || Junis (2–0)  || Gonzales (1–1) ||—|| 12,324 || 4–4 || L1
|-style=background:#bfb
|9||April 10||@ Royals || 8–3 || Hernández (2–1) || Skoglund (0–1) ||—|| 14,850 || 5–4 || W1
|-style=background:#bfb
|10||April 11||@ Royals || 4–2 || Vincent (1–0) || Grimm (0–1) || Díaz (4) || 14,314 || 6–4 || W2
|-style=background:#bfb
|11||April 13|| A's || 7–4 || Altavilla (1–1) || Coulombe (0–1) || Díaz (5) || 25,532 || 7–4 || W3
|-style=background:#bfb
|12||April 14|| A's || 10–8 || Bradford (1–0)|| Graveman (0–3) || Díaz (6) || 29,013 || 8–4 || W4
|-style=background:#fbb
|13||April 15|| A's || 1–2 || Manaea (2–2) ||Hernández (2–2)|| Treinen (3) || 25,882 || 8–5 || L1
|-style=background:#bfb
|14||April 16|| Astros || 2–1 || Paxton (1–1) || Keuchel (0–3) ||Díaz (7) || 12,923 || 9–5 || W1
|-style=background:#fbb
|15||April 17|| Astros || 1–4 || McCullers Jr. (2–1) || Altavilla (1–2) || Devenski (2) || 15,382 || 9–6 || L1
|-style=background:#fbb
|16||April 18|| Astros || 1–7 || Cole (2–0) || Leake (2–1) || — || 14,643 || 9–7 || L2
|-style=background:#fbb
|17||April 19|| Astros || 2–9 || Morton (3–0) || Gonzales (1–2) || — || 16,927 || 9–8 || L3
|-style=background:#bfb
|18||April 20||@ Rangers || 6–2 || Nicasio (1–0) || Kela (2–1) ||—|| 27,811 || 10–8 || W1
|-style=background:#bfb
|19||April 21||@ Rangers || 9–7 || Bradford (2–0) || Claudio (0–1) ||Díaz (8) || 39,016 || 11–8 || W2
|-style=background:#fbb
|20||April 22||@ Rangers || 4–7 || Pérez (2–2) || Ramírez (0–1) || Kela (3) || 33,661 || 11–9 || L1
|-style=background:#fbb
|21||April 23||@ White Sox || 4–10 || Fulmer (1–1) || Leake (2–2) ||—|| 13,614 || 11–10 || L2
|-style=background:#bfb
|22||April 24||@ White Sox || 1–0 || Gonzales (2–2) || Volstad (0–1) ||Díaz (9) || 10,761 || 12–10 || W1
|-style=background:#bfb
|23||April 25||@ White Sox || 4–3 || Hernández (3–2) || Shields (1–3) ||Díaz (10) || 11,417 || 13–10 || W2
|-style=background:#bfb
|24||April 26||@ Indians || 5–4 || Altavilla (2–2) || Goody (0–1) || Díaz (11) || 12,133 || 14–10 || W3
|-style=background:#fbb
|25||April 27||@ Indians || 5–6 || Kluber (4–1) || Ramírez (0–2) ||—|| 16,355 || 14–11 || L1
|-style=background:#bfb
|26||April 28||@ Indians || 12–4 || Leake (3–2) || Carrasco (4–1) || — || 19,172 || 15–11 || W1
|-style=background:#bfb
|27||April 29||@ Indians || 10–4 || Gonzales (3–2) || Tomlin (0–4) || — || 17,878 || 16–11 || W2
|-

|-style=background:#bfb
|28||May 1|| A's || 6–3 || Hernández (4–2) || Triggs (2–1) || Díaz (12) || 12,468 || 17–11 || W3
|-style=background:#fbb
|29||May 2|| A's || 2–3 || Treinen (2–1) || Díaz (0–1) || – || 11,603 || 17–12 || L1
|-style=background:#bfb
|30||May 3|| A's || 4–1 || Bradford (3–0) || Manaea (4–3) || Díaz (13) || 12,888 || 18–12 || W1
|-style=background:#fbb
|31||May 4|| Angels || 0–5 || Richards (4–1) || Leake (3–3) || — || 41,705 || 18–13 || L1
|-style=background:#bfb
|32||May 5|| Angels || 9–8 (11) || Goeddel (1–0) || Johnson (2–1) || — || 36,977 || 19–13 || W1
|-style=background:#fbb
|33||May 6|| Angels || 2–8 || Ohtani (3–1) || Hernández (4–3) || — || 40,142 || 19–14 || L1
|-style=background:#bfb
|34||May 8||@ Blue Jays || 5–0 || Paxton (2–1) || Stroman (0–5) ||—|| 20,513 || 20–14 || W1
|-style=background:#fbb
|35||May 9||@ Blue Jays || 2–5 || Tepera (3–1) || Nicasio (1–1) || Clippard (1) || 20,290 || 20–15 || L1
|-style=background:#bfb
|36||May 10||@ Blue Jays || 9–3 || Leake (4–3) || Happ (4–3) || — || 22,315 || 21–15 || W1
|-style=background:#bbb
| – ||May 11||@ Tigers || Colspan=7| Postponed (rain); Rescheduled for May 12th.
|-style=background:#fbb
|37||May 12||@ Tigers || 3–4 || Boyd (2–3) || Gonzales (3–3) || Greene (8) || 25,506 || 21–16 || L1
|-style=background:#bfb
|38||May 12||@ Tigers || 9–5 || Hernández (5–3) || Fulmer (1–3) || — || 25,506 || 22–16 || W1
|-style=background:#fbb
|39||May 13||@ Tigers || 4–5 || Greene (2–2) || Nicasio (1–2) || — || 24,718 || 22–17 || L1
|-style=background:#bfb
|40||May 14||@ Twins || 1–0 || Pazos (1–0) || Hildenberger (1–1) || Díaz (14) || 16,581 || 23–17 || W1
|-style=background:#bfb
|41||May 15|| Rangers || 9–8 (11) || Goeddel (2–0) || Claudio (1–2) ||—|| 14,670 || 24–17 || W2
|-style=background:#fbb
|42||May 16|| Rangers || 1–5 || Colón (2–1)|| Pazos (1–1) ||—|| 20,629 || 24–18 || L1
|-style=background:#fbb
|43||May 17|| Tigers || 2–3 || Saupold (2–1) || Vincent (1–1) || Greene (10) || 15,169 || 24–19 || L2
|-style=background:#bfb
|44||May 18|| Tigers || 5–4 || Altavilla (3–2) || Farmer (0–2) ||Díaz (15) || 34,932 || 25–19 || W1
|-style=background:#bfb
|45||May 19|| Tigers || 7–2 || Paxton (3–1) || Fiers (4–3) ||—|| 35,759 || 26–19 || W2
|-style=background:#bfb
|46||May 20|| Tigers || 3–2 (11) || Vincent (2–1) || Farmer (0–3) ||—|| 34,252 || 27–19 || W3
|-style=background:#bfb
|47||May 22||@ A's || 3–2 (10) || Vincent (3–1) || Petit (1–1) ||Díaz (16) || 9,408 || 28–19 || W4
|-style=background:#bfb
|48||May 23||@ A's || 1–0 || Gonzales (4–3) || Gossett (0–2) ||Díaz (17)|| 6,991 || 29–19 || W5
|-style=background:#fbb
|49||May 24||@ A's || 3–4 || Petit (2–1) || Hernández (5–4) || Treinen (11)|| 12,633 || 29–20 || L1
|-style=background:#bfb
|50||May 25|| Twins || 2–1 || Paxton (4–1) || Romero (2–1) ||Díaz (18) || 19,924 || 30–20 || W1
|-style=background:#bfb
|51||May 26|| Twins || 4–3 (12) || Bradford (4–0) || Magill (1–1) ||—|| 23,986 || 31–20 || W2
|-style=background:#bfb
|52||May 27|| Twins || 3–1 || Leake (5–3) || Berríos (5–5) ||Colomé (12) || 31,340 || 32–20 || W3
|-style=background:#bfb
|53||May 28|| Rangers || 2–1 || Gonzales (5–3) || Fister (1–5) ||Díaz (19) || 26,236 || 33–20 || W4
|-style=background:#fbb
|54||May 29|| Rangers || 5–9 || Claudio (4–2) || Díaz (0–2) ||—|| 13,259 || 33–21 || L1
|-style=background:#fbb
|55||May 30|| Rangers || 6–7 || Barnette (1–0) || Rzepczynski (0–1) || Kela (12) || 13,070 || 33–22 || L2
|-style=background:#bfb
|56||May 31|| Rangers || 6–1 || LeBlanc (1–0) || Minor (4–4) ||—|| 15,630 || 34–22 || W1
|-

|-style=background:#bfb
|57||June 1|| Rays || 4–3 (13)|| Elías (1–0) || Andriese (1–3) ||–|| 22,636 || 35–22 || W2
|-style=background:#bfb
|58||June 2|| Rays || 3–1 || Gonzales (6–3) || Archer (3–4) || Díaz (20) || 28,599 || 36–22 || W3
|-style=background:#bfb
|59||June 3|| Rays || 2–1 || Hernández (6–4) || Alvarado (0–2) ||Díaz (21) || 26,567 || 37–22 || W4
|-style=background:#bfb
|60||June 5||@ Astros || 7–1 || Paxton (5–1) || Keuchel (3–8) ||—|| 35,646 || 38–22 || W5
|-style=background:#fbb
|61||June 6||@ Astros || 5–7 || Devenski (2–1) || Nicasio (1–3) || Rondón (1) || 30,361 || 38–23 || L1
|-style=background:#bfb
|62||June 7||@ Rays || 5–4 || Leake (6–3) || Pruitt (1–3) ||—|| 10,342 || 39–23 || W1
|-style=background:#bfb
|63||June 8||@ Rays || 4–3 || Gonzales (7–3) || Font (0–3) || Díaz (22) || 12,435 || 40–23 || W2
|-style=background:#fbb
|64||June 9||@ Rays || 3–7 || Snell (8–3) || Hernández (6–5) || Roe (1) || 12,528 || 40–24 || L1
|-style=background:#bfb
|65||June 10||@ Rays || 5–4 || Paxton (6–1) || Alvarado (0–3) || Díaz (23) || 10,512 || 41–24 || W1
|-style=background:#bfb
|66||June 11|| Angels || 5–3 || LeBlanc (2–0) || Heaney (3–5) ||Díaz (24) || 20,116 || 42–24 || W2
|-style=background:#bfb
|67||June 12|| Angels || 6–3 || Leake (7–3) || Barría (5–2) ||Díaz (25) || 20,402 || 43–24 || W3
|-style=background:#bfb
|68||June 13|| Angels || 8–6 || Elías (2–0)|| Drake (1–1) ||—|| 28,236 || 44–24 ||W4
|-style=background:#fbb
|69||June 14|| Red Sox || 1–2 || Price (8–4) || Hernández (6–6) || Kimbrel (22) || 30,479 || 44–25 || L1
|-style=background:#bfb
|70||June 15|| Red Sox || 7–6 || Cook (1–0) || Barnes (0–2) ||Díaz (26) || 44,459 || 45–25 || W1
|-style=background:#bfb
|71||June 16|| Red Sox || 1–0 || LeBlanc (3–0) || Wright (2–1) || Díaz (27) || 44,151 || 46–25 || W2
|-style=background:#fbb
|72||June 17|| Red Sox || 3–9 || Rodríguez (9–1) || Leake (7–4) ||—|| 46,462 || 46–26 || L1
|-style=background:#fbb
|73||June 19||@ Yankees || 2–7 || Germán (2–4) || Gonzales (7–4) ||—|| 45,122 || 46–27 || L2
|-style=background:#fbb
|74||June 20||@ Yankees || 5–7 || Chapman (3–0) || Cook (1–1) ||—|| 46,047 || 46–28 || L3
|-style=background:#fbb
|75||June 21||@ Yankees || 3–4 || Severino (11–2) || Paxton (6–2) || Chapman (22) || 46,658 || 46–29 || L4
|-style=background:#fbb
|76||June 22||@ Red Sox || 10–14 || Barnes (1–2) || Nicasio (1–4) ||—|| 37,342 || 46–30 || L5
|-style=background:#bfb
|77||June 23||@ Red Sox || 7–2 || Leake (8–4)||  Rodríguez (9–2) ||—|| 36,051 || 47–30 || W1
|-style=background:#fbb
|78||June 24||@ Red Sox || 0–5 || Sale (7–4) || Gonzales (7–5) ||—|| 36,274 || 47–31 || L1
|-style=background:#bfb
|79||June 25||@ Orioles || 5–3 || Hernández (7–6)  || Castro (2–3) || Díaz (28) || 21,102 || 48–31 || W1
|-style=background:#bfb
|80||June 26||@ Orioles || 3–2 || Paxton (7–2) || O'Day (0–2) ||Díaz (29) || 16,327 || 49–31 || W2
|-style=background:#bfb
|81||June 27||@ Orioles || 8–7 (11) || Bradford (5–0) || Givens (0–5) || Díaz (30) || 15,502 || 50–31 || W3
|-style=background:#bfb
|82||June 28||@ Orioles || 4–2 (10)|| Pazos (2–1) || Castro (2–4) ||Nicasio (1) || 14,263 || 51–31 || W4
|-style=background:#bfb
|83||June 29|| Royals || 4–1 || Gonzales (8–5) || Kennedy (1–8) ||—|| 25,558 || 52–31 || W5
|-style=background:#bfb
|84||June 30|| Royals || 6–4 || Hernández (8–6) || Hammel (2–10) ||Díaz (31)|| 33,395 || 53–31 || W6
|-

|-style=background:#bfb
|85||July 1|| Royals || 1–0 ||  Paxton (8–2) || Keller (2–3) || Díaz (32) || 38,344 || 54–31 || W7
|-style=background:#bfb
|86||July 3|| Angels || 4–1 || LeBlanc (4–0) || Heaney (4–6) || Díaz (33) || 38,624 || 55–31 || W8
|-style=background:#fbb
|87||July 4|| Angels || 4–7 || Richards (5–4) || Leake (8–5) || Parker (10) || 39,518 || 55–32 || L1
|-style=background:#bfb
|88||July 5|| Angels || 4–1 || Gonzales (9–5) || Barría (5–6) || Díaz (34) || 32,128 || 56–32 || W1
|-style=background:#fbb
|89||July 6|| Rockies || 1–7|| Márquez (7–8) || Hernández (8–7) ||—|| 26,554 || 56–33 || L1
|-style=background:#fbb
|90||July 7|| Rockies || 1–5 || Oberg (2–0) || Paxton (8–3) ||—|| 36,102 || 56–34 || L2
|-style=background:#bfb
|91||July 8|| Rockies || 6–4 || LeBlanc (5–0) || Senzatela (3–2) || Díaz (35) || 34,440 || 57–34 || W1
|-style=background:#fbb
|92||July 10||@ Angels || 3–9 || Ramirez (4–3) || Leake (8–6) ||—|| 33,092 || 57–35 || L1
|-style=background:#bfb
|93||July 11||@ Angels || 3–0 || Gonzales (10–5) || Barría (5–7) || Díaz (36) || 35,591 || 58–35 || W1
|-style=background:#fbb
|94||July 12||@ Angels || 2–11 || Skaggs (7–5) || Paxton (8–4) ||—|| 44,027 || 58–36 || L1
|-style=background:#fbb
|95||July 13||@ Rockies || 7–10 || Musgrave (1–3) || Bergman (0–1) || Davis (26) || 38,126 || 58–37 || L2
|-style=background:#fbb
|96||July 14||@ Rockies || 1–4 || Gray (8–7) || LeBlanc (5–1) || Davis (27) || 47,789|| 58–38 || L3
|-style=background:#fbb
|97||July 15||@ Rockies || 3–4 || Oberg (4–0) || Vincent (3–2) ||—|| 35,630 || 58–39 || L4
|-style=background:
|colspan="10"|89th All-Star Game in Washington, D.C.
|-style=background:#bfb
|98||July 20|| White Sox || 3–1 || LeBlanc (6–1) || Shields (4–11) || Díaz (37) || 43,331 || 59–39 || W1
|-style=background:#fbb
|99||July 21|| White Sox || 0–5 || Covey (4–5) || Hernández (8–8) ||—|| 38,186 || 59–40 || L1
|-style=background:#bfb
|100||July 22|| White Sox || 8–2 || Gonzales (11–5) || López (4–8) ||—|| 38,207 || 60–40 || W1
|-style=background:#fbb
|101||July 24|| Giants || 3–4 || Watson (3–3) || Díaz (0–3) || Smith (4) || 40,276 || 60–41 || L1
|-style=background:#bfb
|102||July 25|| Giants || 3–2 || Colomé (3–5) || Watson (3–4) || Díaz (38) || 45,548 || 61–41 || W1
|-style=background:#fbb
|103||July 27||@ Angels || 3–4 (10)|| Johnson (3–2) || Nicasio (1–5) ||—|| 42,336 || 61–42 || L1
|-style=background:#fbb
|104||July 28||@ Angels || 5–11 || Barria (6–7) || Hernández (8–9) ||—|| 43,325 || 61–43 || L2
|-style=background:#bfb
|105||July 29||@ Angels || 8–5 || Gonzales (12–5) || Peña (1–2) || Díaz (39) || 35,396 || 62–43 || W1
|-style=background:#bfb
|106||July 30|| Astros || 2–0 || Paxton (9–4) || Cole (10–3) || Díaz (40) || 35,198 || 63–43 || W2
|-style=background:#fbb
|107||July 31|| Astros || 2–5 || Morton (12–2)|| Leake (8–7) || Rondón (10) || 28,478 || 63–44 || L1
|-

|-style=background:#fbb
|108||August 1|| Astros || 3–8 || Keuchel (9–9)|| LeBlanc (6–2) ||—|| 34,575 || 63–45 || L2
|-style=background:#fbb
|109||August 2|| Blue Jays || 3–7 || Hauschild (1–0) || Nicasio (1–6) ||—|| 26,110 || 63–46 || L3
|-style=background:#fbb
|110||August 3|| Blue Jays || 2–7 || Borucki (1–2) || Gonzales (12–6) ||—|| 30,715 || 63–47 || L4
|-style=background:#fbb
|111||August 4|| Blue Jays || 1–5 || Estrada (5–8) || Paxton (9–5) ||—|| 41,238 || 63–48 || L5
|-style=background:#bfb
|112||August 5|| Blue Jays || 6–3 || Duke (4–4) || Biagini (1–6) || Díaz (41) || 40,515 || 64–48 || W1
|-style=background:#bfb
|113||August 6||@ Rangers || 4–3 (12) || Tuivailala (4–3) || Butler (2–2) || Díaz (42) || 17,759 || 65–48 || W2
|-style=background:#fbb
|114||August 7||@ Rangers || 4–11 || Colón (6–10) || Hernández (8–10) ||—|| 17,575 || 65–49 || L1
|-style=background:#fbb
|115||August 8||@ Rangers || 7–11 || Gallardo (7–1) ||  Gonzales (12–7) ||—|| 20,116 || 65–50 || L2
|-style=background:#bfb
|116||August 9||@ Astros || 8–6 || Paxton (10–5) || Verlander (11–7) || Díaz (43) || 34,976 || 66–50 || W1
|-style=background:#bfb
|117||August 10||@ Astros || 5–2 || Warren (1–1) || Cole (10–5) || Díaz (44) || 41,236 || 67–50 || W2
|-style=background:#bfb
|118||August 11||@ Astros || 3–2 || LeBlanc (7–2) || Morton (12–3) || Díaz (45) || 38,888 || 68–50 || W3
|-style=background:#bfb
|119||August 12||@ Astros || 4–3 (10)|| Duke (5–4) || Osuna (1–1) || Díaz (46) || 40,048 || 69–50 || W4
|-style=background:#fbb
|120||August 13||@ A's || 6–7 || Manaea (11–8) || Gonzales (12–8) || Treinen (31) || 10,400 || 69–51 || L1
|-style=background:#fbb
|121||August 14||@ A's || 2–3 || Fiers (8–6) || Hernández (8–11) || Treinen (32) || 17,419 || 69–52 || L2
|-style=background:#bfb
|122||August 15||@ A's || 2–0 (12) || Pazos (3–1) || Petit (5–3) || Díaz (47) || 17,078 || 70–52 || W1
|-style=background:#fbb
|123||August 17|| Dodgers || 1–11 || Buehler (6–4) || LeBlanc (7–3) ||—|| 46,796 || 70–53 || L1
|-style=background:#bfb
|124||August 18|| Dodgers || 5–4 (10)|| Warren (2–1) || Ferguson (3–2) ||—|| 43,264 || 71–53 || W1
|-style=background:#fbb
|125||August 19|| Dodgers || 1–12 || Kershaw (6–5) || Elías (2–1) ||—|| 45,519 || 71–54 || L1
|-style=background:#bfb
|126||August 20|| Astros || 7–4 || Colomé (4–5) || McHugh (5–2) || Díaz (48) || 27,072 || 72–54 || W1
|-style=background:#fbb
|127||August 21|| Astros || 2–3 || Valdez (1–0) || Detwiler (0–1) || Rondón (14) || 25,415 || 72–55 || L1
|-style=background:#fbb
|128||August 22|| Astros || 7–10 || Morton (13–3) || Gonzales (12–9) || Osuna (10) || 31,076 || 72–56 || L2
|-style=background:#bfb
|129||August 24||@ Diamondbacks || 6–3 || Ramírez (1–2) || Godley (13–7) || Díaz (49) || 43,867 || 73–56 || W1
|-style=background:#bfb
|130||August 25||@ Diamondbacks || 4–3 (10) || Colomé (5–5) || Diekman (1–2) || Díaz (50) || 34,968 || 74–56 || W2
|-style=background:#fbb
|131||August 26||@ Diamondbacks || 2–5 || Greinke (13–8) || Leake (8–8) ||Boxberger (29) || 37,175 || 74–57 || L1
|-style=background:#fbb
|132||August 28||@ Padres || 1–2 || Nix (2–2) || Hernández (8–12) || Yates (6) || 25,168 || 74–58 || L2
|-style=background:#fbb
|133||August 29||@ Padres || 3–8 || Lucchesi (7–7) || Ramírez (1–3) ||—|| 20,266 || 74–59 || L3
|-style=background:#bfb
|134||August 30||@ A's || 7–1 || LeBlanc (8–3) || Montas (5–4) ||—|| 10,044 || 75–59 || W1
|-style=background:#fbb
|135||August 31||@ A's || 5–7 || Petit (6–3) || Leake (8–9) || Treinen (34) || 17,942 || 75–60 || L1
|-

|-style=background:#bfb
|136||September 1||@ A's || 8–7 || Paxton (11–5) || Hendricks (0–1) || Díaz (51) || 28,760 || 76–60 || W1
|-style=background:#fbb
|137||September 2||@ A's || 2–8 || Jackson (5–3) || Hernández (8–13) || Treinen (35) || 21,496 || 76–61 || L1
|-style=background:#bfb
|138||September 3|| Orioles || 2–1 || Ramírez (2–3) || Rogers (1–1) || Díaz (52) || 20,579 || 77–61 || W1
|-style=background:#fbb
|139||September 4|| Orioles || 3–5 || Cobb (5–15) || Warren (2–2) || Givens (6) || 11,265 || 77–62 || L1
|-style=background:#bfb
|140||September 5|| Orioles || 5–2 || Leake (9–9) || Cashner (4–14) || Díaz (53) || 15,017 || 78–62 || W1
|-style=background:#fbb
|141||September 7|| Yankees || 0–4 || Tanaka (11–5) || Paxton (11–6) ||—|| 32,195 || 78–63 || L1
|-style=background:#fbb
|142||September 8|| Yankees || 2–4 || Lynn (9–10) || Vincent (3–3) || Betances (3) || 38,733 || 78–64 || L2
|-style=background:#bfb
|143||September 9|| Yankees || 3–2 || Colomé (6–5) || Betances (4–5) || Díaz (54) || 34,917 || 79–64 || W1
|-style=background:#fbb
|144||September 11|| Padres || 1–2 || Stammen (8–2) || Díaz (0–4) || Yates (8) || 13,388 || 79–65 || L1
|-style=background:#fbb
|145||September 12|| Padres || 4–5 || Lucchesi (8–8) || LeBlanc (8–4) ||  Yates (9) || 17,164 || 79–66 || L2
|-style=background:#bfb
|146||September 13||@ Angels || 8–2 || Leake (10–9) || Despaigne (2–3) ||—|| 33,328 || 80–66 || W1
|-style=background:#bfb
|147||September 14||@ Angels || 5–0 || Warren (3–2) || Shoemaker (2–1) ||—|| 39,872 || 81–66 || W2
|-style=background:#bfb
|148||September 15||@ Angels || 6–5 || Pazos (4–1) || Álvarez (5–4) || Díaz (55) || 42,292 || 82–66 || W3
|-style=background:#fbb
|149||September 16||@ Angels || 3–4 || Cole (2–2) || Vincent (3–4) || Buttrey (3) || 35,578 || 82–67 || L1
|-style=background:#bfb
|150||September 17||@ Astros || 4–1 || Cook (2–1) || Rondón (2–5) || Díaz (56) || 43,144 || 83–67 || W1
|-style=background:#fbb
|151||September 18||@ Astros || 0–7 || James (1–0) || Leake (10–10) ||—|| 35,715 || 83–68 || L1
|-style=background:#bfb
|152||September 19||@ Astros || 9–0 || Lawrence (1–0) || Keuchel (11–11) ||—|| 31,229 || 84–68 || W1
|-style=background:#fbb
|153||September 21||@ Rangers || 3–8 (7) || Jurado (4–5) || Ramírez (2–4) ||—|| 29,420 || 84–69 || L1
|-style=background:#bfb
|154||September 22||@ Rangers || 13–0 || Gonzales (13–9) || Minor (12–8) ||—|| 31,158 || 85–69 || W1
|-style=background:#fbb
|155||September 23||@ Rangers || 1–6 || Springs (1–1) || LeBlanc (8–5) || — || 31,269 || 85–70 || L1
|-style=background:#fbb
|156||September 24|| A's || 3–7 || Buchter (5–0) || Armstrong (0–1) || — || 16,491 || 85–71 || L2
|-style=background:#bfb
|157||September 25|| A's || 10–8 (11) || Colomé (7–5) || Pagan (3–1) ||—|| 12,791 || 86–71 || W1
|-style=background:#fbb
|158||September 26|| A's || 3–9 || Buchter (6–0) || Hernández (8–14)||—|| 13,727 || 86–72 || L1
|-style=background:#fbb
|159||September 27|| Rangers || 0–2 || Jurado (5–5) || Duke (5–5) || Leclerc (12) || 15,799 || 86–73 || L2
|-style=background:#bfb
|160||September 28|| Rangers || 12–6 || LeBlanc (9–5) || Pérez (2–7) || — || 23,598 || 87–73 || W1
|-style=background:#bfb
|161||September 29|| Rangers || 4–1 || Vincent (4–4) || Sampson (0–3) || Díaz (57) || 31,780 || 88–73 || W2
|-style=background:#bfb
|162||September 30|| Rangers || 3–1 || Elías (3–1) || Gallardo (8–8) || Armstrong (1) || 21,146 || 89–73 || W3
|-

|- style="text-align:center;"
| Legend:       = Win       = Loss       = PostponementBold = Mariners team member

Standings

American League West

American League Wild Card

Record against opponents

Roster

Statistics

Batting

Players in bold finished the season on the active roster.

Note: G = Games played; AB = At bats; R = Runs; H = Hits; 2B = Doubles; 3B = Triples; HR = Home runs; RBI = Runs batted in; SB = Stolen bases; BB = Walks; K = Strikeouts; Avg. = Batting average; OBP = On-base percentage; SLG = Slugging percentage;

Pitching

Players in bold finished the season on the active roster.

Note: W = Wins; L = Losses; ERA = Earned run average; G = Games pitched; GS = Games started; SV = Saves; IP = Innings pitched; H = Hits allowed; R = Runs allowed; ER = Earned runs allowed; BB = Walks allowed; K = Strikeouts

Farm system

References

External links
Seattle Mariners Official Site 
2018 Seattle Mariners season at Baseball Reference

Seattle Mariners seasons
Seattle Mariners season
Seattle Mariners
Seattle Mariners